Niculae Zamfir (born 26 July 1958) is a Romanian wrestler. He competed in the men's Greco-Roman 57 kg at the 1984 Summer Olympics.

References

1958 births
Living people
Romanian male sport wrestlers
Olympic wrestlers of Romania
Wrestlers at the 1984 Summer Olympics
People from Dâmbovița County
Universiade gold medalists for Romania
Universiade medalists in wrestling
Medalists at the 1981 Summer Universiade
20th-century Romanian people
World Wrestling Championships medalists